Habib Azar (born October 19, 1979 in Pennsylvania, United States) is an American film, theater and television director based in New York City. He married his wife, Carla Azar, in 2011, and has two children.

Career
Eight-time Emmy winner Habib Azar's directing work spans contemporary opera, film and TV. Azar specializes in directing and producing multi-camera live performing arts events for broadcast. Trained as a composer, he combines musical knowledge, narrative storytelling and the technical capacity to manage live broadcasts. He has directed nearly 500 hours of network television. Azar has filmed ensembles and performers including Lang Lang, Yo-Yo Ma, Renee Fleming, Itzhak Perlman, Wynton Marsalis, the New York Philharmonic, Staatskapelle Berlin, Merce Cunningham Dance Company, and the Mariinsky Theater Orchestra. Azar is also a producer and director for The All-Star Orchestra on PBS.

Film
Azar directed the 2018 cinemacast of Marnie for the Metropolitan Opera's Live in HD series. Azar directed the Live From Lincoln Center film production of Pipeline, a play by Dominque Morisseau, during its 2017 Off-Broadway run at Lincoln Center Theater's Mitzi E. Newhouse Theater. He is the director of the New York Philharmonic’s facebook live series.

His first feature film Armless for which he both directed and wrote the score was an official selection of the Sundance Film Festival and went on to win awards at festivals around the world. Armless is an off-kilter comedy about a man who suffers from body integrity identity disorder. His second feature film Saint Janet stars Kelly Bishop and was released by Indie Rights.

Stage
Azar's stage work focuses on world premiere and rarely performed contemporary operas.

He directed the world premiere of the original chamber version of Du Yun's Angel's Bone with the International Contemporary Ensemble commissioned by the Mann Center for the Performing Arts. Angel's Bone went on to win the Pulitzer Prize in Music.

He directed the American stage premiere of Georg Friedrich Haas' ATTHIS in a well-received production that had the heroine bound in duct tape. In the climactic scene she stripped naked by violently ripping the duct tape from her body in what the New York Times said 'must be one of the most searingly painful and revealing operatic performances of recent times.'

His other productions include the world premiere of Lewis Nielson's USW with Opera Cabal of Chicago and the 2007 production of Luigi Nono's rarely performed A Floresta e Jovem e Cheja de Vida with the International Contemporary Ensemble toured the US and Mexico and was the subject of an extended analysis in The Drama Review.

Azar has directed numerous plays including Gorilla Man at PS122.

Television
In 2013 Azar directed all 8 episodes of the groundbreaking series The All Star Orchestra for PBS. The program gathered principal musicians from major American orchestras to film concert works especially for television.  Other live multi-camera arts specials directed by Azar include Yo-Yo Ma for Live from Lincoln Center, The New York Philharmonic, Kronos Quartet, Lang Lang, Mariinsky Orchestra, Merce Cunningham Dance Company, the National Symphony Orchestra, NHK Symphony Orchestra, and the Chamber Music Society of Lincoln Center.  

Azar has worked extensively in soap operas, having directed multiple episodes of As the World Turns, The Young and the Restless, All My Children, and One Life to Live.

He has won 8 Emmy Awards for his work in TV.

Awards and nominations
Daytime Emmy Award
Win, 2007, Directing, As the World Turns
Nominated, 2012, Directing, The Young and the Restless
Win, 2014, Directing, One Life to Live

Northwest Regional Emmy Award

 Win, 2016, Directing, The All Star Orchestra

New York Emmy Award
Win, 2014, Directing, The All Star Orchestra
Win, 2015, Directing, The All Star Orchestra
Win, 2017, Directing, The All Star Orchestra
Win, 2019, Directing, US Marine Band with The All Star Orchestra
Win, 2021, Director, The All Star Orchestra

References

External links

American television directors
1979 births
American people of Lebanese descent
Living people
Carnegie Mellon University College of Fine Arts alumni